Banbridge is a town in County Down, Northern Ireland. It lies on the River Bann and the A1 road and is named after a bridge built over the River Bann in 1712. It is situated in the civil parish of Seapatrick and the historic barony of Iveagh Upper, Upper Half. The town began as a coaching stop on the road from Belfast to Dublin and thrived from Irish linen manufacturing. The town was home to the headquarters of the former Banbridge District Council. Following a reform of local government in Northern Ireland in 2015, Banbridge became part of Armagh City, Banbridge and Craigavon Borough Council. It had a population of 16,637 in the 2011 Census.

The town's main street is very unusual, rising to a steep hill before levelling out. In 1834 an underpass was built as horses with heavy loads would faint before reaching the top of the hill. It was built by William Dargan and is officially named 'Downshire Bridge', though it is often called "The Cut".

History

Banbridge, home to the "Star of the County Down", is a relatively young town, first entering recorded history around 1691 during the aftermath of the struggle between William III and James II. An Outlawry Court was set up in the town to deal with the followers of James. The town grew up around the site where the main road from Belfast to Dublin crossed the River Bann over an Old Bridge which was situated where the present bridge now stands.

The town owes its success to flax and the linen industry, becoming the principal linen producing district in Ireland by 1772 with a total of 26 bleachgreens along the Bann. By 1820 the town was the centre of the 'Linen Homelands' and its prominence grew when it became a staging post on the mail coach route between Dublin and Belfast. A gift of £500 from the Marquis of Downshire around this time helped to alleviate some problems with the steepness of the road and paid for significant improvements. This industry has now greatly diminished in prominence, but Banbridge still has three of the major producers in Ulster; Weavers, Thomas Ferguson & Co, and John England Irish Linen.

Recently, Banbridge has been twinned with Ruelle in France.

The Burnings of 1920
In 1920, Banbridge saw violence related to the ongoing Irish War of Independence and partition of Ireland. On 17 July, the Irish Republican Army (IRA) assassinated British colonel Gerald Smyth in Cork. He had ordered police officers to shoot civilians if they did not immediately obey orders. In a 17 June 1920 speech at the Listowel, County Kerry Royal Irish Constabulary station Smyth is quoted as saying: "The more you shoot, the better I will like you, and I assure you no policeman will get into trouble for shooting any man." Smyth was from a wealthy Banbridge family, and his large funeral was held there on 21 July. After Smyth's funeral, about 3,000 Protestant loyalists took to the streets of Banbridge and wreaked revenge on the Catholic community. Many Catholic homes and businesses were attacked, burned and looted, despite police being present. A large mob of loyalists, some of them armed, attacked and tried to break into the home of a republican family. The father fired on the mob, killing Protestant William Sterritt. A local Orange lodge was later named in his honour. Hundreds of Catholic factory workers were also forced from their jobs, and many Catholic families fled Banbridge. Calm was restored after the British Army were deployed in the town. In the summer of 1920 sectarian rioting occurred in several other towns/cities in east Ulster: Belfast, Dromore and Newtownards. This period of communal violence has been referred to as the Belfast Pogrom.

The Troubles
Banbridge had three major bombings during the Troubles. On 15 March 1982, a Provisional IRA bomb on Bridge Street killed a schoolboy and injured 36 people. On 4 April 1991, another IRA bomb of 1,000 lb of explosives caused widespread damage and injured a police officer outside Banbridge Courthouse. There was also a dissident republican bombing on 1 August 1998 after the signing of the Good Friday Agreement (see 1998 Banbridge bombing) when a bomb detonated outside a shoe shop in Newry Street.

Townlands
Like the rest of Ireland, the Banbridge area has long been divided into townlands, whose names mostly come from the Irish language. Banbridge sprang up in a townland called Ballyvally. Over time, the surrounding townlands have been built upon and they have lent their names to many streets, roads and housing estates. The following is a list of townlands within Banbridge's urban area, alongside their likely etymologies:
Ballydown (from Baile an Dúin meaning "townland of the stronghold")
Ballymoney (from Baile Muine meaning "townland of the thicket")
Ballyvally (from Baile an Bhealaigh meaning "townland of the routeway")
Drumnagally (from Dromainn Ó gCeallaigh meaning "O'Kelly's ridge")
Edenderry (from Éadan Doire meaning "hill-brow of the oak-wood")
Tullyear (from Tulaigh Eirre meaning "hillock of the boundary")

Demography
On Census day (27 March 2011) there were 16,637 people living in Banbridge (6,693 households), accounting for 0.92% of the NI total, representing an increase of 12.8% on the Census 2001 population of 14,744. Of these:
 21.92% were aged under 16 years and 13.69% were aged 65 and over;
 51.21% of the usually resident population were female and 48.79% were male;
 59.17% belong to or were brought up in a 'Protestant and Other Christian (including Christian related)' religion and 34.38% belong to or were brought up in the Catholic Christian faith;
 61.59% indicated that they had a British national identity, 31.48% had a Northern Irish national identity and 15.39% had an Irish national identity (respondents could indicate more than one national identity);
 37 years was the average (median) age of the population;
 6.83% had some knowledge of Irish (Gaelic) and 6.35% had some knowledge of Ulster-Scots.

Places of interest

Near the town lie the ancient Lisnagade Fort, Legannany Dolmen, and the Loughbrickland Crannóg, constructed around the year 500 AD. The Old Town Hall in Banbridge was completed in 1834.

Notable people

 
 
Captain Francis Crozier, British naval officer and Arctic explorer, was born in Banbridge in 1796.
Robbie Dennison, former Wolverhampton Wanderers FC winger and Northern Ireland football international.
Samuel Fryar, politician from the 1930s.
Dame Anna Hassan, educator, school principal.
Dermott Lennon world show jumping champion hails from Ballinaskeagh just outside Banbridge.
Samantha Lewthwaite, terrorism suspect.
F. E. McWilliam, surrealist sculptor.
John Mitchel, Irish nationalist activist and political journalist.
Cyril Scott, actor
Joseph M. Scriven, writer of the poem which became the hymn "What a Friend We Have in Jesus".
Jonathan Tuffey, Former Northern Ireland international goalkeeper, currently playing with Crusaders in the NIFL Premiership.
John Butler Yeats, artist and father of four artistic children. Among them were William Butler Yeats and Jack Butler Yeats.

Transport
Banbridge is on the A1 main road between Belfast and Newry.

Banbridge had its own railway station from 1859 until 1956. The Banbridge, Newry, Dublin and Belfast Junction Railway opened Banbridge (BJR) railway station on 23 March 1859. In contrast with its very long name, this was a short branch line between Banbridge and Scarva. Banbridge (BJR) railway station was closed in favour of the new Banbridge (BLBR) railway station.

The Great Northern Railway took over both companies in 1877 and opened a branch line from Banbridge to Ballyroney in 1880. In 1906 the GNR opened an extension from Ballyroney to Castlewellan, where it connected with a new Belfast and County Down Railway branch line to Newcastle, County Down.

In 1953 the governments of Northern Ireland and the Irish Republic jointly nationalised the GNR as the GNR Board. On 1 May 1955 the GNRB closed Banbridge's lines to Scarva and Castlewellan. Banbridge (BLBR) railway station closed on 29 April 1956, when the GNRB closed the line from Knockmore Junction.

Education

Primary
Abercorn Primary School
Ballydown Primary School
Bridge Integrated Primary School
Bronte Primary School
Edenderry Primary School
Milltown Cemetery Primary School
St. Mary's Primary School (Catholic)

Post-primary
Banbridge Academy 
Banbridge High School
St Patrick's College, Banbridge 
New-Bridge Integrated College

Sport
The Banbridge Hockey Club plays at Havelock Park.

Other sports clubs include Banbridge Bowling Club, Banbridge Town F.C. and Banbridge Rugby Club.

Pop culture
"The Star of the County Down" is a well known song associated with Banbridge.
One of the Game of Thrones sets is in Linen Mills Studio, which was converted from a failed linen mill.

See also
List of towns and villages in Northern Ireland
List of localities in Northern Ireland by population
Market Houses in Northern Ireland

References

Sources

External links

 
Towns in County Down
Civil parish of Seapatrick